Shurabeh-ye Sofla Yek (also Romanized as Shūrābeh-ye Soflá Yek; also known as Shūrābeh-ye Soflá) is a village in Kunani Rural District, Kunani District, Kuhdasht County, Lorestan Province, Iran. At the 2006 census, its population was 567, in 117 families.

References 

Towns and villages in Kuhdasht County